Dinabandhu Malla, also known as Dinu was the thirty-ninth king of the Mallabhum. He ruled from 1334 to 1345 CE.

History
Dinabandhu Malla was responsible for the establishment of Vishnu Vashudev icon holding Sankha, Chakra, Gada, Padma at Lochanpur.

References

Sources
 

Malla rulers of the Bankura
Kings of Mallabhum
14th-century Indian monarchs
Malla rulers
Mallabhum